Cronstedtite is a complex iron silicate mineral belonging to the serpentine group of minerals.

It was discovered in 1821 and named in honor of Swedish mineralogist Axel Fredrik Cronstedt (1722–1765). It has been found in Bohemia in the Czech Republic and in Cornwall, England.

Cronstedtite is a major constituent of CM chondrites, a carbonaceous chondrite group exhibiting varying degrees of aqueous alteration.  Cronstedtite abundance decreases with increasing alteration.

See also
List of minerals
List of minerals named after people

References 

Iron(II,III) minerals
Serpentine group
Trigonal minerals
Minerals in space group 157